Puppet Up! – Uncensored is a Adult live puppet musical show produced by The Jim Henson Company combining puppetry and improvisational comedy created by Brian Henson and Groundlings performer Patrick Bristow. The show is advertised for "adults only" and as "uncensored". However, one rare and "exclusive" set of shows "for children" were held in Edinburgh in 2006.

The sketches in the live show are not pre-planned and the shows contain all true improv. The puppeteers in the Henson improv troupe trained with Patrick Bristow for nine months to perfect their improv skills prior to their first show. Just like the Groundlings, the Henson improv sketches are performed based on audience suggestions.

History

Puppet Improv (March-May 2006)
Brian Henson, producer of the show, recalled the genesis of the show in a 2006 interview stating, "we began doing puppet improv workshops to hone our comedy skills and realized that we were having so much fun that audiences might enjoy watching too." In the fall of 2005 a show was performed in the sound stage of the Jim Henson Studios for friends and invited industry guests. The two shows were so successful that the group was invited to the 2006 HBO’s U.S. Comedy Arts Festival, where it made its public debut. Jim Henson's Puppet Improv was performed at two shows featuring Henson, Bill Barretta, Julianne Buescher, Leslie Carrara-Rudolph, Drew Massey, Paul Rugg, Allan Trautman and Victor Yerrid. Willie Etra was the musical director and operated the keyboards.

Puppet Up! (June-October 2006)
In June 2006, Jim Henson’s Puppet Improv began performing under a new name, Puppet Up! - Uncensored The troupe performed four shows over three nights at The Improv in Hollywood.

In August 2006 Puppet Up! traveled to the Edinburgh Fringe Festival for 30 shows. Two versions of the show were performed: the regular "adult only" version and, for the first time, a family-friendly "for kids" show.

Puppet Up! - Uncensored (November 2006-November 2009)
Puppet Up! performed two shows at Caesars Palace in November 2006. These shows were filmed as part of HBO and AEG Live's The Comedy Festival. HBO and TBS produced a 1st and only hour-long television special from these shows that aired five days later on TBS. TBS also ordered 30 web-exclusive episodes of "Puppet Up!" for their "Laugh Lab" video service on TBS.com. The web series debuted on TBS.com on March 7, 2007.

"Puppet Up! Uncensored" performed at the Anahein Grove on March 4, 2007.

"Puppet Up! Uncensored" found a home at the historic Avalon theatre for several months out of the year between 2007 and 2009.

Stuffed and Unstrung (April 2010-April 2013)
In April 2010, the show was brought to New York City under the title Stuffed and Unstrung, featuring all new technical effects and original music and staging. 

"Stuffed and Unstrung" pays tribute to Jim Henson with re-creations of two of his most famous routines from "The Tonight Show":
 "I've Grown Accustomed to Your Face" features a female puppet (which resembles the earlier version of Kermit the Frog) singing the classic song to another puppet (who resembles a rebuilt Yorick) who scarily changes features
 "Java" depicts a violent brawl between two creatures trying to dance to the rollicking Al Hirt instrumental track.

Bobby Vegan and Sampson Knight from the pilot to Henson Alternative's Tinseltown appear as the fictional executive producers of "Stuffed and Unstrung." Bobby and Sampson appear in a pre-taped video introduction and segments for the show as well as being featured in the show's promotional material.

They performed 10 shows under the new name at the San Francisco Sketch Fest in August 2011.

Puppet Up! - Uncensored 2.0 (August 2013-March 2022)
In August 2013, they were invited back to the Edinburgh Fringe Festival and resumed their previous name, "Puppet Up! Uncensored"

"Puppet Up! Uncensored" toured Toronto, Canada in October 2013.

"Puppet Up! Uncensored" did a show at the Kirk Douglas Theatre in Culver City, CA in February 2014.

"Puppet Up! Uncensored" did a brief US Tour in March 2014 including UT, PA, IL, MI and WI before heading out internationally to do the Melbourne Comedy Festival in Australia at the end of the month.

"Puppet Up! Uncensored" performed at the Pasadena Playhouse in July 2014.

"Puppet Up! Uncensored" returned to San Francisco to perform several shows at the Marine Memorial Theatre in November 2014.

"Puppet Up! Uncensored" did a few more shows at the Kirk Douglas Theatre in Culver City, CA in 2015 and early 2016 before heading to Las Vegas, NV.

On July 21, 2016, Puppet Up! - Uncensored began performing monthly shows at Venetian Hotel & Casino in Las Vegas. It closed on September 17, 2016.

"Puppet Up! Uncensored" returned to its original home at the historic Jim Henson Company lot in Hollywood, to perform weekend shows on 3/11/2017, 6/17/2017, 1/27/2018, 7/28/2018, 11/3/2017, 6/8/2019, 1/25/2020, 7/31/2021 and 3/4/2022.

On January 27, 2020, "Puppet Up!" became Celebrity Puppet Up! - Uncensored. "Celebrity Puppet Up!" is a new game show that began performing at the Jim Henson Company Lot right after the Weekend shows.

The Worldwide Pandemic of the COVID-19 virus put the shows on a major hiatus after the January 2020 shows.

"Puppet Up! Uncensored" returned to do 4 shows on the weekend of July 31, 2021 at the historic Jim Henson Company lot in Hollywood, following all the 
CDC and LA County guidelines for live events, therefore requiring all guests to wear face masks to protect against the spread of the COVID-19 virus for the duration of each 90 minute show.

Halloween Horror Version
Puppet Up! - Uncensored performed at Knott's Scary Farm for the event's 2019 season, from September 20 to November 2.

"Puppet Up! Uncensored" returned to perform shows at Knott's Scary Farm for the event's 2021 season, from September 16 to October 31.

Puppet Up! - Uncensored 3.0 (August 2022)
"Puppet Up! Uncensored" will return to perform shows at the Jim Henson Company lot in Hollywood to perform 5 weekend shows on August 12, 2022. These five performances will also feature new interpretations of classic sketches originally created by Jim Henson that will be making their Puppet Up! – Uncensored debut.

Halloween Horror Version
"Puppet Up! Uncensored" return to perform shows at Knott's Scary Farm for the event's 2022 season, from September 22 to October 31.

Miskreant Puppets
Early on, the improv show featured many puppets recycled from past projects from The Jim Henson Company. As the show grew, new and original puppets were created that joined the show. In 2006, new Puppet Up! puppets were designed by Julianne Buescher and Drew Massey. The puppets were built by Julianne Buescher, Drew Massey, Patrick Johnson, and Sean Johnson with help and guidance from veteran Muppet designer/builder Jane Gootnick. These puppets have been labeled as the Miskreant Puppets.

Puppeteers
Alongside Bristow and Henson, among the puppeteers who have performed in Puppet Up! are:
 Anthony Asbury
 Grant Baciocco
 Jennifer Barnhart
 Bill Barretta
 Tim Blaney
 Julianne Buescher
 Tyler Bunch (June 2006 - September 2016)
 Kevin Carlson
 Leslie Carrara-Rudolph
 Brian Clark
 Marcus Clarke
 Melissa Creighton
 Stephanie D'Abruzzo
 Dorien Davies
 Alice Dinnean
 Peggy Etra
 Genevieve Flati
 James Godwin
 Patrick Johnson
 Sean Johnson
 Brian Jones
 Donna Kimball
 Karen Maruyama
 Drew Massey
 Jess McKay
 Ted Michaels
 Alison Mork
 Sarah Oh
 Michael Oosterom
 Carla Rudy
 Paul Rugg
 Colleen Smith
 Allan Trautman
 Russ Walko
 Vanessa Whitney
 Victor Yerrid
 Andy Hayward

Other appearances
 Puppet Up! was featured in an episode of Celebrity Apprentice.
 Some of the puppets from Puppet Up! have appeared in other series, including Simian Undercover Detective Squad, Neil's Puppet Dreams and  That Puppet Game Show. They often appear as different panelists on the news satire series No, You Shut Up!. Most of the show's puppets also appeared in The Happytime Murders, a Nintendo commercial & Coldplay.

Awards and nominations

See also
 The Early Muppets (1955-1976):
 Sam and Friends (1955-1961)

References

External links
 The Official Puppet Up! website
 Puppet Up! at Henson.com
 Puppet Up! news blog
  - 2006 television special

Improvisational television series
The Jim Henson Company
Web series featuring puppetry